Predgorny is a rural locality (a settlement) in Srostinsky Selsoviet, Biysky District, Altai Krai, Russia. The population was 97 as of 2013. There are 2 streets.

Geography 
Predgorny is located 45 km southeast of Biysk (the district's administrative centre) by road. Srostki is the nearest rural locality.

References 

Rural localities in Biysky District